BML Munjal University is a fully residential and co-educational private university located in Sidhrawali, Gurgaon district, Haryana, India. The University was founded in 2014 by the promoters of the Hero Group, and is named after the group's chairman and founder Brij Mohan Lall Munjal.
It offers B.Tech, BCom (Honours), BBA, MBA, Law and Ph.D degrees.

History 
The university was launched in two phases. The School of Engineering & Technology, School of Management and School of Commerce will be established in phase I, beginning August 2014.  In phase II, four additional schools are proposed: School of Liberal Arts, School of Art, Architecture & Design, School of Natural Sciences and School of Law.

Founders 

 Brijmohan Lall Munjal (Padma Bhushan awardee)
 Renu Munjal
 Suman Kant Munjal
 Pawan Munjal
 Sunil Kant Munjal
 Akshay Munjal

References

External links 
 

Private universities in India
Universities in Haryana
Business schools in Haryana
Gurgaon district